The 1966–67 Soviet Cup was an association football cup competition of the Soviet Union. The winner of the competition, Dinamo Moscow qualified for the continental tournament.

Competition schedule

Preliminary stage

Group 1 (Russian Federation)

Preliminary round
 SPARTAK Mogilyov              2-1  Spartak Oryol

First round
 AVANGARD Kolomna              1-0  Znamya Noginsk 
 DINAMO Bryansk                1-0  Spartak Mogilyov 
 GRANITAS Klaipeda             2-0  Khimik Novomoskovsk 
 LOKOMOTIV Kaluga              1-0  Spartak Brest 
 METALLURG Tula                1-0  Neman Grodno 
 Spartak Ryazan                1-2  ISKRA Smolensk 
 ZNAMYA TRUDA Orekhovo-Zuyevo  3-1  Zvejnieks Liepaja 
 ZVEZDA Serpukhov              4-0  Dvina Vitebsk

Quarterfinals
 AVANGARD Kolomna              1-0  Zvezda Serpukhov 
 LOKOMOTIV Kaluga              1-0  Dinamo Bryansk 
 METALLURG Tula                2-0  Granitas Klaipeda 
 ZNAMYA TRUDA Orekhovo-Zuyevo  2-1  Iskra Smolensk

Semifinals
 LOKOMOTIV Kaluga              4-0  Metallurg Tula 
 Znamya Truda Orekhovo-Zuyevo  1-1  Avangard Kolomna

Semifinals replays
 ZNAMYA TRUDA Orekhovo-Zuyevo  3-1  Avangard Kolomna

Final
 Lokomotiv Kaluga              0-2  ZNAMYA TRUDA Orekhovo-Zuyevo

Group 2 (Russian Federation)

Preliminary round
 KOVROVETS Kovrov              1-0  Dinamo Vologda              [aet]

First round
 Khimik Dzerzhinsk             1-2  METALLURG Lipetsk 
 ONEZHETS Petrozavodsk         3-0  Velozavodets Penza 
 SEVER Murmansk                4-2  Spartak Saransk 
 TEKMASH Kostroma              1-0  Torpedo Lyubertsy 
 Torpedo Pavlovo               0-0  Kovrovets Kovrov 
 Torpedo Podolsk               0-1  SATURN Rybinsk 
 TRAKTOR Vladimir              1-0  Metallurg Cherepovets 
 Volga Ulyanovsk               1-1  Avtomobilist Leningrad

First round replays
 TORPEDO Pavlovo               3-0  Kovrovets Kovrov 
 VOLGA Ulyanovsk               2-1  Avtomobilist Leningrad

Quarterfinals
 Metallurg Lipetsk             0-1  TRAKTOR Vladimir 
 SATURN Rybinsk                2-1  TekMash Kostroma 
 Sever Murmansk                1-2  ONEZHETS Petrozavodsk 
 VOLGA Ulyanovsk               3-0  Torpedo Pavlovo

Semifinals
 ONEZHETS Petrozavodsk         2-1  Volga Ulyanovsk 
 SATURN Rybinsk                1-0  Traktor Vladimir

Final
 ONEZHETS Petrozavodsk         2-0  Saturn Rybinsk

Group 3 (Russian Federation)

Preliminary round
 Spartak Belgorod              1-2  KHIMIK Balakovo 
 Textilshchik Mingechaur       0-1  TRUD Togliatti

First round
 ENERGIYA Volzhskiy            1-0  Torpedo Taganrog 
 KALITVA Belaya Kalitva        1-0  Trud Kursk 
 LOKOMOTIV Baku                1-0  Trud Togliatti 
 Polad Sumgait                 1-1  Metallurg Kuibyshev 
 PROGRESS Kamensk              5-1  Khimik Balakovo 
 Shakhtyor Shakhty             0-0  Spartak Tambov 
 TORPEDO Armavir               2-0  TyazhMash Syzran 
 VOLGAR Astrakhan              6-1  Energiya Novocherkassk

First round replays
 POLAD Sumgait                 3-0  Metallurg Kuibyshev 
 SHAKHTYOR Shakhty             3-2  Spartak Tambov

Quarterfinals
 Polad Sumgait                 1-1  Lokomotiv Baku 
 PROGRESS Kamensk              1-0  Kalitva Belaya Kalitva 
 SHAKHTYOR Shakhty             1-0  Energiya Volzhskiy 
 VOLGAR Astrakhan              2-1  Torpedo Armavir

Quarterfinals replays
 POLAD Sumgait                 3-0  Lokomotiv Baku

Semifinals
 SHAKHTYOR Shakhty             3-2  Progress Kamensk            [aet] 
 VOLGAR Astrakhan              1-0  Polad Sumgait

Final
 Volgar Astrakhan              1-2  SHAKHTYOR Shakhty

Group 4 (Russian Federation)

Preliminary round
 LORI Kirovakan                1-0  Lernagorts Kafan 
 MESHAKHTE Tkibuli             3-0  Dila Gori 
 SEVAN Oktemberyan             2-0  Araks Yerevan

First round
 Alazani Gurjaani              1-1  Meshakhte Tkibuli 
 CEMENT Novorossiysk           3-1  Mashuk Pyatigorsk 
 DINAMO Makhachkala            5-1  Urozhai Derbent 
 DINAMO Sukhumi                6-0  Metallurg Rustavi 
 INGURI Zugdidi                4-1  Kolkhida Poti 
 LORI Kirovakan                3-1  Sevan Oktemberyan 
 UROZHAI Krymsk                1-0  Spartak Orjonikidze 
 UROZHAI Maykop                7-1  Uralan Elista

First round replays
 ALAZANI Gurjaani              w/o  Meshakhte Tkibuli

Quarterfinals
 CEMENT Novorossiysk           3-1  Urozhai Krymsk 
 DINAMO Makhachkala            2-1  Urozhai Maykop 
 DINAMO Sukhumi                2-1  Lori Kirovakan              [aet] 
 INGURI Zugdidi                2-0  Alazani Gurjaani

Semifinals
 DINAMO Makhachkala            2-1  Dinamo Sukhumi 
 Inguri Zugdidi                1-2  CEMENT Novorossiysk

Final
 CEMENT Novorossiysk           4-3  Dinamo Makhachkala

Group 5 (Russian Federation)

Preliminary round
KAUCHUK Sterlitamak           1-0  Dinamo Kirov

First round
 CHAIKA Zelyonodolsk           3-2  Trud Kurgan 
 ENERGIYA Cheboksary           3-0  Neftyanik Tyumen 
 KHIMIK Berezniki              4-2  Metallurg Magnitogorsk      [aet] 
 Khimik Salavat                0-0  Kauchuk Sterlitamak 
 LOKOMOTIV Orenburg            3-1  Strela Sverdlovsk 
 METALLURG Zlatoust            w/o  Zenit Izhevsk 
 NEFTYANIK Bugulma             1-0  Spartak Yoshkar-Ola         [aet] 
 URALETS Nizhniy Tagil         1-0  Torpedo Miass

First round replays
 KHIMIK Salavat                1-0  Kauchuk Sterlitamak

Quarterfinals
 CHAIKA Zelyonodolsk           3-1  Energiya Cheboksary 
 Lokomotiv Orenburg            1-2  NEFTYANIK Bugulma           [aet] 
 METALLURG Zlatoust            3-1  Khimik Salavat 
 URALETS Nizhniy Tagil         7-0  Khimik Berezniki

Semifinals
 CHAIKA Zelyonodolsk           w/o  Neftyanik Bugulma 
 URALETS Nizhniy Tagil         1-0  Metallurg Zlatoust

Final
 CHAIKA Zelyonodolsk           1-0  Uralets Nizhniy Tagil

Group 6 (Russian Federation)

Preliminary round
 CEMENTNIK Semipalatinsk       2-1  Shakhtyor Kiselyovsk

First round
 ANGARA Irkutsk                2-0  Progress Biysk 
 AVANGARD Komsomolsk-na-Amure  1-0  Zabaikalets Chita 
 IRTYSH Pavlodar               2-1  Cementnik Semipalatinsk 
 LOKOMOTIV Krasnoyarsk         3-1  Metallurg Novokuznetsk 
 Rybak Nakhodka                1-1  Amur Blagoveshchensk 
 SELENGA Ulan-Ude              1-0  Okean Vladivostok 
 SHAKHTYOR Prokopyevsk         1-0  Torpedo Rubtsovsk           [aet]

First round replays
 RYBAK Nakhodka                3-1  Amur Blagoveshchensk

Quarterfinals
 AVANGARD Komsomolsk-na-Amure  3-0  Angara Irkutsk 
 SELENGA Ulan-Ude              3-1  Rybak Nakhodka 
 Shakhtyor Prokopyevsk         1-2  IRTYSH Pavlodar 
 Start Angarsk                 0-2  LOKOMOTIV Krasnoyarsk

Semifinals
 IRTYSH Pavlodar               2-1  Lokomotiv Krasnoyarsk 
 SELENGA Ulan-Ude              1-0  Avangard Komsomolsk-na-Amure

Final
 Selenga Ulan-Ude              0-0  Irtysh Pavlodar

Replay
 SELENGA Ulan-Ude              1-0  Irtysh Pavlodar             [aet]

Group 1 (Ukraine)

Preliminary round
 DUNAYETS Izmail               4-3  Avtomobilist Odessa         [aet] 
 Kolos Poltava                 1-2  KRIVBASS Krivoi Rog         [aet] 
 SHAKHTYOR Alexandria          3-1  Trubnik Nikopol 
 SPARTAK Melitopol             2-0  SKF Sevastopol

First round
 Avangard Makeyevka            0-0  Avangard Kramatorsk 
 Desna Chernigov               0-1  POLESYE Zhitomir 
 DUNAYETS Izmail               2-0  Spartak Melitopol 
 KRIVBASS Krivoi Rog           2-0  Shakhtyor Alexandria 
 NEFTYANIK Drogobych           3-1  Dinamo Khmelnitskiy 
 Shakhtyor Kadiyevka           2-3  KOMMUNARETS Kommunarsk 
 START Dzerzhinsk              2-0  Lokomotiv Donetsk 
 Volyn Lutsk                   1-2  KOLHOSPNIK Rovno

First round replays
 Avangard Makeyevka            1-3  AVANGARD Kramatorsk         [aet]

Quarterfinals
 AVANGARD Kramatorsk           3-2  Krivbass Krivoi Rog 
 KOLHOSPNIK Rovno              3-1  Neftyanik Drogobych 
 POLESYE Zhitomir              2-1  Dunayets Izmail 
 Start Dzerzhinsk              1-2  KOMMUNARETS Kommunarsk

Semifinals
 KOMMUNARETS Kommunarsk        4-3  Avangard Kramatorsk 
 POLESYE Zhitomir              2-0  Kolhospnik Rovno

Final
 POLESYE Zhitomir              2-0  Kommunarets Kommunarsk

Group 2 (Ukraine)

Preliminary round
 Khimik Severodonetsk          2-3  SHAKHTYOR Krasny Luch 
 Kolhospnik Cherkassy          0-1  DNEPR Kremenchug 
 Lokomotiv Kherson             1-2  AVANGARD Zholtyye Vody 
 Torpedo Berdyansk             0-3  AZOVETS Zhdanov

First round
 Avangard Ternopol             0-1  VERKHOVINA Uzhgorod 
 AVANGARD Zholtyye Vody        2-0  Azovets Zhdanov 
 CHAIKA Sevastopol             4-1  Avangard Kerch              [aet] 
 DNEPR Kremenchug              3-1  Shakhtyor Krasny Luch 
 DNEPROVETS Dneprodzerzhinsk   1-0  Shakhtyor Gorlovka 
 SHAKHTYOR Torez               2-1  Shakhtyor Yenakiyevo 
 SPARTAK Ivano-Frankovsk       2-1  Bukovina Chernovtsy 
 SPARTAK Sumy                  1-0  Torpedo Kharkov

Quarterfinals
 AVANGARD Zholtyye Vody        4-0  Spartak Sumy 
 CHAIKA Sevastopol             3-1  Dneprovets Dneprodzerzhinsk 
 DNEPR Kremenchug              3-2  Shakhtyor Torez 
 VERKHOVINA Uzhgorod           5-2  Spartak Ivano-Frankovsk

Semifinals
 AVANGARD Zholtyye Vody        1-0  Verkhovina Uzhgorod 
 Chaika Sevastopol             0-1  DNEPR Kremenchug

Final
 DNEPR Kremenchug              2-1  Avangard Zholtyye Vody

Group Central Asia and Kazakhstan

Preliminary round
 Pahtaaral Gulistan            0-1  KHIMIK Chirchik 
 ZAHMET Charjou                3-1  Fakel Buhara

First round
 ADK Alma-Ata                  1-2  SVERDLOVETS Tashkent Region 
 Akkurgan Tashkent Region      1-2  SPARTAK Andizhan 
 ALAY Osh                      3-2  Pahtakor Kurgan-Tyube 
 Dinamo Tselinograd            1-1  Sogdiana Samarkand 
 Khimik Chirchik               0-0  Zarafshan Navoi 
 METALLURG Almalyk             2-0  Zahmet Charjou 
 Metallurg Chimkent            1-2  METALLURG Temirtau 
 Voskhod Jambul                0-3  VAKHSH Nurek

First round replays
 DINAMO Tselinograd            1-0  Sogdiana Samarkand 
 KHIMIK Chirchik               2-0  Zarafshan Navoi

Quarterfinals
 Metallurg Almalyk             1-1  Dinamo Tselinograd 
 METALLURG Temirtau            2-1  Sverdlovets Tashkent Region 
 SPARTAK Andizhan              2-0  Alay Osh                    [aet] 
 VAKHSH Nurek                  3-1  Khimik Chirchik

Quarterfinals replays
 Metallurg Almalyk             0-1  DINAMO Tselinograd          [aet]

Semifinals
 SPARTAK Andizhan              3-2  Dinamo Tselinograd          [aet] 
 Vakhsh Nurek                  1-2  METALLURG Temirtau

Final
 Spartak Andizhan              1-1  Metallurg Temirtau

Replay
 SPARTAK Andizhan              1-0  Metallurg Temirtau

Final stage

Preliminary round
 [Apr 9] 
 AVTOMOBILIST Zhitomir         2-0  Vostok Ust-Kamenogorsk 
 BALTIKA Kaliningrad           w/o  SKA Novosibirsk 
 DNEPR Kremenchug              w/o  RostSelMash Rostov-na-Donu  
 LUCH Vladivostok              w/o  Metallurg Zaporozhye 
 METALLIST Kharkov             1-0  Spartak Andizhan 
 SHAKHTYOR Shakhty             w/o  Stroitel Ashkhabad 
 SHINNIK Yaroslavl             w/o  Energetik Dushanbe 
 SPARTAK Nalchik               2-1  Neftyanik Fergana 
 TAVRIA Simferopol             3-0  Kuban Krasnodar 
 TEREK Grozny                  2-1  SKA Lvov 
 TRUD Voronezh                 1-0  SKA Kiev 
 UralMash Sverdlovsk           1-1  Žalgiris Vilnius 
 Znamya Truda Orekhovo-Zuyevo  0-1  SPARTAK Gomel 
 ZVEZDA Kirovograd             2-1  SKA Odessa                  [aet]

Preliminary round replays
 [Apr 10] 
 URALMASH Sverdlovsk           1-0  Žalgiris Vilnius

First round
 [Apr 20] 
 AVTOMOBILIST Zhitomir         4-1  Baltika Kaliningrad 
   [? – Richard Milevich] 
 CEMENT Novorossiysk           2-1  Shakhtyor Karaganda         [aet] 
 Chaika Zelyonodolsk           2-2  Daugava Riga 
   [? – Gunars Ulmanis-2] 
 DINAMO Kirovabad              2-0  Torpedo Tomsk 
 Dinamo Stavropol              0-2  SUDOSTROITEL Nikolayev 
   [Yevgeniy Derevyaga, Yevgeniy Dannecker] 
 DINAMO Tallinn                w/o  Shirak Leninakan 
 DNEPR Kremenchug              2-0  Volga Gorkiy 
 KUZBASS Kemerovo              2-1  Politotdel Tashkent Region 
   [Nikolai Chernomyrdin-2 - ?] 
 LOKOMOTIV Chelyabinsk         w/o  Avangard Zholtyye Vody 
 Metallist Kharkov             0-1  TEREK Grozny 
 MOLDOVA Kishinev              w/o  Irtysh Omsk 
 Onezhets Petrozavodsk         1-2  LOKOMOTIV Vinnitsa 
 PAMIR Leninabad               2-0  Dnepr Dnepropetrovsk 
 RUBIN Kazan                   2-1  Lokomotiv Kaluga 
  [Nikolai Vorobyov, Vyacheslav Bulavin - ?] 
 SELENGA Ulan-Ude              w/o  Meshakhte Tkibuli 
 Shakhtyor Shakhty             0-0  Trud Voronezh 
 Shinnik Yaroslavl             0-1  TAVRIA Simferopol 
 SOKOL Saratov                 4-0  Spartak Orjonikidze 
 Spartak Gomel                 1-1  SKA Khabarovsk 
   [Anatoliy Zhukov 16 – Boris Kopeikin 8] 
 SPARTAK Nalchik               1-0  UralMash Sverdlovsk 
 TEMP Barnaul                  3-1  Dinamo Batumi 
   [Vladimir Markin 6, Boris Brykin 34, 85 – ?] 
 Textilshchik Ivanovo          0-1  KARPATY Lvov 
   [Vladimir Meshcheryakov 59] 
 TRAKTOR Volgograd             3-2  Dinamo Leningrad 
 VOLGA Kalinin                 2-1  Stroitel Ufa 
   [Lev Gorshkov, Yuriy Khromov – Vladimir Varbuzov] 
 ZVEZDA Kirovograd             w/o  Luch Vladivostok 
 ZVEZDA Perm                   w/o  Lokomotiv Tbilisi

First round replays
 [Apr 21] 
 CHAIKA Zelyonodolsk           1-0  Daugava Riga                [aet] 
 Shakhtyor Shakhty             0-2  TRUD Voronezh 
 SPARTAK Gomel                 1-0  SKA Khabarovsk 
   [Boris Vasilyev 17]

Second round
 [May 11] 
 Cement Novorossiysk           2-2  Dinamo Kirovabad 
 DNEPR Kremenchug              2-1  Spartak Nalchik 
 Karpaty Lvov                  0-1  LOKOMOTIV Chelyabinsk       [aet] 
 LOKOMOTIV Vinnitsa            2-0  Moldova Kishinev 
 Rubin Kazan                   0-0  Traktor Volgograd 
 SOKOL Saratov                 5-0  Selenga Ulan-Ude 
 Sudostroitel Nikolayev        0-1  KUZBASS Kemerovo 
   [Vladimir Razdayev] 
 TAVRIA Simferopol             2-0  Avtomobilist Zhitomir 
 TEMP Barnaul                  2-0  Dinamo Tallinn 
   [Vladimir Markin 3 pen, Viktor Sadovnikov 39] 
 Terek Grozny                  2-2  Spartak Gomel 
   [? – Boris Vasilyev, Nikolai Mishin] 
 TRUD Voronezh                 2-1  Zvezda Kirovograd 
 VOLGA Kalinin                 4-1  Chaika Zelyonodolsk 
 ZVEZDA Perm                   3-1  Pamir Leninabad

Second round replays
 [May 12] 
 Cement Novorossiysk           0-1  DINAMO Kirovabad            [aet] 
 RUBIN Kazan                   3-0  Traktor Volgograd 
 TEREK Grozny                  1-0  Spartak Gomel

Third round
 [May 19] 
 Dinamo Kirovabad              1-1  Chernomorets Odessa 
   [Valeriy Stupin – Ishtvan Sekech] 
 Dnepr Kremenchug              0-2  DINAMO Kiev 
   [Vladimir Shchegolkov 20, Yozhef Sabo 83] 
 Krylya Sovetov Kuibyshev      0-1  DINAMO Tbilisi              [aet] 
   [Slava Metreveli] 
 KUZBASS Kemerovo              2-1  SKA Rostov-na-Donu 
   [Vladimir Akuzin, Vitaliy Razdayev – Nikolai Polshchikov] 
 Lokomotiv Chelyabinsk         0-2  NEFTYANIK Baku 
   [Rafik Ali-zade, Ruslan Abdullayev] 
 LOKOMOTIV Moskva              4-0  Torpedo Kutaisi 
   [Valeriy Sheludko-2, Vladimir Korotkov, Boris Petrov] 
 Lokomotiv Vinnitsa            0-2  PAHTAKOR Tashkent 
   [Berador Abduraimov-2] 
 RUBIN Kazan                   3-0  Zenit Leningrad 
   [Alexei Biryuchevskiy 9, Viktor Teterkin 11, Nikolai Vorobyov 43] 
 Sokol Saratov                 1-1  Spartak Moskva 
   [Yuriy Smirnov 69 – Yuriy Falin 13] 
 Tavria Simferopol             0-3  CSKA Moskva 
   [Nikolai Antonevich 20, Vladimir Polikarpov 41, Vladimir Fedotov 83] 
 Temp Barnaul                  0-1  KAYRAT Alma-Ata 
   [Oleg Volokh] 
 Terek Grozny                  0-1  SHAKHTYOR Donetsk 
   [Valeriy Lobanovskiy 67] 
 Trud Voronezh                 0-0  Dinamo Moskva 
 Volga Kalinin                 0-1  TORPEDO Moskva 
   [Alexandr Lenyov] 
 Zarya Lugansk                 1-1  Dinamo Minsk 
   [Alexandr Bankovskiy 69 – Veniamin Arzamastsev 15] 
 ZVEZDA Perm                   3-1  Ararat Yerevan 
   [? – Seiran Galstyan]

Third round replays
 [May 20] 
 Dinamo Kirovabad              0-1  CHERNOMORETS Odessa 
   [Viktor Miroshin 18] 
 SOKOL Saratov                 1-0  Spartak Moskva 
   [Viktor Chernyshkov 58] 
 Trud Voronezh                 1-4  DINAMO Moskva 
   [Vladimir Yanishevskiy 16 – Viktor Votolovskiy 14, 40, Yuriy Vshivtsev 44, Boris Kokh 69] 
 Zarya Lugansk                 0-2  DINAMO Minsk 
   [Anatoliy Vasilyev 65, Mikhail Mustygin 85]

Fourth round
 [Jul 7] 
 CSKA Moskva             3-0  Dinamo Kiev 
   [Vladimir Kaplichny 21, Vladimir Polikarpov ?, 65] 
 NEFTYANIK Baku          2-1  Dinamo Tbilisi 
   [? – Mikhail Meskhi] 
 PAHTAKOR Tashkent       1-0  Dinamo Minsk 
   [Hamid Rahmatullayev 35] 
 Shakhtyor Donetsk       2-3  DINAMO Moskva            [aet] 
   [Petras Glodenis 26, Oleg Bazilevich 91 – Gennadiy Gusarov 29, Viktor Anichkin 93, Valeriy Maslov 120] 
 TORPEDO Moskva          4-0  Kuzbass Kemerovo 
   [Eduard Streltsov 17, Gennadiy Shalimov 27, Vladimir Shcherbakov 44, Alexandr Lenyov 83 pen] 
 [Jul 8] 
 CHERNOMORETS Odessa     3-1  Rubin Kazan 
   [Vladimir Sak 20, 62, Vasiliy Moskalenko 30 pen – Alexei Biryuchevskiy 82] 
 Kayrat Alma-Ata         0-2  SOKOL Saratov 
   [Boris Filipenko 54, Vyacheslav Pashovkin 60] 
 LOKOMOTIV Moskva        3-0  Zvezda Perm 
   [Boris Petrov 9, Vladimir Mikhailov 10, Vladimir Basalayev 16]

Quarterfinals
 [Aug 18] 
 CSKA Moskva             2-1  Lokomotiv Moskva 
   [Taras Shulyatitskiy 20 pen, Anatoliy Maslyayev 70 – Boris Petrov 45] 
 NEFTYANIK Baku          3-2  Pahtakor Tashkent 
   [Eduard Markarov-2, Valeriy Gajiyev – Gennadiy Krasnitskiy-2] 
 [Aug 19] 
 SOKOL Saratov           3-1  Chernomorets Odessa      [aet] 
   [Vyacheslav Pashovkin 53, 112, Viktor Lipatov 94 – Viktor Zubkov 66] 
 Torpedo Moskva          0-1  DINAMO Moskva 
   [Valeriy Maslov 90]

Semifinals
 [Sep 15] 
 CSKA Moskva             0-0  Neftyanik Baku 
 [Sep 16] 
 DINAMO Moskva           4-0  Sokol Saratov 
   [Vladimir Kozlov 4, Gennadiy Yevryuzhikhin 35, Viktor Votolovskiy 74, 77]

Semifinals replays
 [Sep 16] 
 CSKA Moskva             2-0  Neftyanik Baku 
   [Vladimir Fedotov, Vladimir Dudarenko]

Final

External links
 Complete calendar. helmsoccer.narod.ru
 1967 Soviet Cup. Footballfacts.ru
 1967 Soviet football season. RSSSF

Soviet Cup seasons
Cup
Cup
Soviet Cup